Gu Shiau-shuang (born 7 August 1997) is a Taiwanese karateka. She won the gold medal in the women's kumite 50 kg event at the 2018 Asian Games held in Jakarta, Indonesia. In the final, she defeated Bakhriniso Babaeva of Uzbekistan.

At the 2017 Asian Karate Championships held in Astana, Kazakhstan, she won the silver medal in the women's team kumite event. In 2018, at the Asian Karate Championships held in Amman, Jordan, she won one of the bronze medals in the women's kumite 50 kg event. She repeated this in 2019 with a bronze medal in the same event.

In 2018, she won the silver medal in the women's kumite 50 kg event at the World University Karate Championships held in Kobe, Japan. She won one of the bronze medals in her event at the 2021 Asian Karate Championships held in Almaty, Kazakhstan.

She lost her bronze medal match in the women's 50 kg at the 2022 World Games held in Birmingham, United States.

Achievements

References 

Living people
1997 births
Place of birth missing (living people)
Taiwanese female karateka
Karateka at the 2018 Asian Games
Asian Games medalists in karate
Asian Games gold medalists for Chinese Taipei
Medalists at the 2018 Asian Games
Competitors at the 2022 World Games
21st-century Taiwanese women